Paulchoffatiidae is a family of extinct mammals that lived predominantly during the Upper Jurassic period, though a couple of genera are known from the Early Cretaceous. Fossils have been reported from Europe (Portugal, Spain, Germany and England) . Paulchoffatiids were members of the order Multituberculata. They were relatively early representatives and are within the informal suborder of "Plagiaulacida". The family was named by G. Hahn in 1969, and it honors the Portuguese geologist Léon Paul Choffat. Two subfamilies are recognized.

The most productive fossil site for Paulchoffatiids has been Guimarota, Portugal. Remains from this locality are generally diagnosed on the basis of lower or upper jaws. In only one instance, that of Kuehneodon, has it been possible to match the two up. Some of the lower jaws probably represent the same animals as some of the upper, so the diversity of Paulchoffatiids is very possibly exaggerated. As the site is now a flooded, disused coalmine, further excavations are highly unlikely. However, other locations may yet provide more clarity.

The Paulchoffatiids have been further arranged into two subfamilies and a couple of other genera.

Rugosodon from the Middle Jurassic of China, known from a mostly complete skeleton, was formerly referred to the family, but was later considered an indeterminate member of the Paulchoffatiid-line.

Subfamily Paulchoffatiinae 

Paulchoffatia, Bathmochoffatia, Guimarotodon, Henkelodon, Kielanodon, Meketibolodon, Meketichoffatia, Plesiochoffatia, Pseudobolodon, Galveodon, Sunnyodon, Xenachoffatia

Subfamily Kuehneodontinae 

This taxon is restricted to one genus, Kuehneodon, with seven species.

Taxonomy
Subclass  †Allotheria Marsh, 1880
 Order †Multituberculata Cope, 1884:
 Suborder †Plagiaulacida Simpson 1925
 Family †Paulchoffatiidae Hahn, 1969
 Subfamily †Paulchoffatiinae Hahn, 1971
 Genus †Paulchoffatia Kühne, 1961
 Species †P. delgadoi Kühne, 1961
 Genus †Pseudobolodon Hahn, 1977
 Species †P. oreas Hahn, 1977
 Species †P. krebsi Hahn & Hahn, 1994
 Genus †Henkelodon Hahn, 1987
 Species †H. naias Hahn, 1987
 Genus †Guimarotodon Hahn, 1969
 Species †G. leiriensis Hahn, 1969
 Genus †Meketibolodon (Hahn, 1978) Hahn, 1993
 Species †M. robustus (Hahn, 1978) Hahn, 1993
 Genus †Plesiochoffatia Hahn & Hahn, 1999
 Species †P. thoas Hahn & Hahn, 1998
 Species †P. peparethos Hahn & Hahn, 1998
 Species †P. staphylos Hahn & Hahn, 1998
 Genus †Xenachoffatia Hahn & Hahn, 1998
 Species †X. oinopion Hahn & Hahn, 1998
 Genus †Bathmochoffatia Hahn & Hahn, 1998
 Species †B. hapax Hahn & Hahn, 1998
 Genus †Kielanodon Hahn, 1987
 Species †K. hopsoni Hahn, 1987
 Genus †Meketichoffatia Hahn, 1993
 Species †M. krausei Hahn, 1993
 Genus †Galveodon Hahn & Hahn, 1992
 Species †G. nannothus Hahn & Hahn, 1992
 Genus †Sunnyodon Kielan-Jaworowska & Ensom, 1992
 Species †S. notleyi Kielan-Jaworowska & Ensom, 1992
 Subfamily †Kuehneodontinae Hahn, 1971
 Genus †Kuehneodon Hahn, 1969
 Species †K. dietrichi Hahn, 1969
 Species †K. barcasensis Hahn & Hahn, 2001
 Species †K. dryas Hahn, 1977
 Species †K. guimarotensis Hahn, 1969
 Species †K. hahni Antunes, 1988
 Species †K. simpsoni Hahn, 1969
 Species †K. uniradiculatus Hahn, 1978

References 

 Hahn G. and Hahn R. (2000), Multituberculates from the Guimarota mine, p. 97-107 in Martin T. and Krebs B. (eds), Guimarota - A Jurassic Ecosystem, Published by Dr Friedrich Pfeil in Münich, Germany.
 Kielan-Jaworowska Z. and Hurum J.H. (2001), "Phylogeny and Systematics of multituberculate mammals". Paleontology 44, p. 389-429.
 Much of this information has been derived from  MESOZOIC MAMMALS; Basal Multituberculata, an Internet directory.

Multituberculates
Jurassic first appearances
Cretaceous extinctions
Prehistoric mammal families
Fossil taxa described in 1969